Jack Iscaro (born 4 August 1997) is an American rugby union player, currently playing for . His preferred position is prop.

Early career
Iscaro is from the greater DC area. He attended University of California, Berkeley where he won two Championships in 2018 and 2019.

Professional career
After leaving university, Iscaro signed for Glasgow Warriors on a training contract. He signed for Old Glory DC ahead of the 2020 Major League Rugby season, although didn't debut until the 2021 season due to injury. He has remained with the side since.

Iscaro represented the USA U20 team in 2017, before earning selection for the full United States side in 2022, making his debut against Kenya.

References

External links
itsrugby.co.uk Profile

1997 births
Living people
American rugby union players
United States international rugby union players
Rugby union props
Old Glory DC players